Elongation factor 1-delta is a protein that in humans is encoded by the EEF1D gene.

Function 

This gene encodes a subunit of the elongation factor-1 complex, which is responsible for the enzymatic delivery of aminoacyl tRNAs to the ribosome. This subunit functions as guanine nucleotide exchange factor. It is reported that this subunit interacts with HIV-1 Tat, and thus it represses the translation of host-cell, but not HIV-1, mRNAs. Several alternatively spliced transcript variants have been found for this gene, however, the full length nature of only two variants has been determined.

Interactions 

EEF1D has been shown to interact with Glycyl-tRNA synthetase, EEF1G and KTN1, and is predicted to interact with TMEM63A.

References

Further reading